Naimabad (also Romanized as Na‘īmābād; also known as Nahīmābād) is a village in Yazdanabad Rural District, Yazdanabad District, Zarand County, Kerman Province, Iran. At the 2006 census, its population was 910, in 235 families.

References 

Populated places in Zarand County